The  Finarwa massacre was a mass extrajudicial killing that took place in Finarwa in the Tigray Region of Ethiopia during the Tigray War, on 5 March 2021. Finarwa is a village that belongs to woreda Samre, Southeastern zone of Tigray.

Massacre
The Eritrean Defence Forces (EDF) killed five civilians in Finarwa (Southeastern Tigray) on 5 March 2021.

Typical massacres committed by Ethiopian and Eritrean soldiers in the Tigray war are (1) revenge when they lose a battle; (2) to terrorise and extract information about whereabouts of TPLF leaders; (3) murder of suspected family members of TDF fighters; and (4) terrorising the Tigray society as a whole such as in case of mass killings in churches.

Two earlier massacres have been reported in Finarwa, on 6 November 2020 (six civilian victims) and 2 January 2021 (eight civilian victims). There are no further details about the victims.

Perpetrators
On Twitter, Tim Vanden Bempt reported the perpetrators of this massacre as being Eritrean soldiers.

Victims
The “Tigray: Atlas of the humanitarian situation” mentions five victims of this massacre, four of whom have been identified.

Reactions
The “Tigray: Atlas of the humanitarian situation”, that documented this massacre received international media attention, particularly regarding its Annex A, that lists massacres in the Tigray War.

After months of denial by the Ethiopian authorities that massacres occurred in Tigray, a joint investigation by OHCHR and the Ethiopian Human Rights Commission was announced in March 2021.

While the Ethiopian government promised that Eritrean troops will be pulled out from Tigray, the Eritrean government denies any participation in warfare in Tigray, let alone in massacres.

References

External links
World Peace Foundation: Starving Tigray

2021 massacres of the Tigray War
Extrajudicial killings in Ethiopia
Mass murder in Africa
March 2021 events in Africa
Massacres committed by Eritrea